This is a list of episodes from the eleventh season of Shark Tank. The season premiered on Sunday, September 29, 2019 on ABC.

Episodes

Guest sharks this season include Katrina Lake, founder and CEO of Stitch Fix; Daniel Lubetzky, founder and CEO of Kind; tennis player Maria Sharapova; and Anne Wojcicki, CEO and co-founder of 23andMe. Recurring Sharks include Rohan Oza and Matt Higgins.

References

External links 
 Official website
 

11
2019 American television seasons
2020 American television seasons